The Ant-class gunboat was a class of twenty-four Royal Navy flat-iron gunboats mounting a single 10-inch gun, built between 1870 and 1880. They carried no masts or sails, being among the first Royal Navy vessels not to do so.  The last four vessels were ordered separately and are sometimes known as the ''Gadfly'' class, although they were essentially identical. Members of the class lingered on as steam lighters, dredgers, boom defence vessels and base ships, lasting in some cases into the 1950s.

Design
The flat-iron gunboats were designed for coastal defence and bombardment, and were constructed from iron. They were not rigged, and the single 10-inch (18 ton) muzzle-loading rifle was fitted forward on a hydraulic mount that allowed it to be lowered for a sea passage to improve the vessel's seaworthiness, and raised for action. Power was provided by a pair of two-cylinder horizontal single-expansion steam engines driving twin screws.

Ships

References

Gunboat classes
 
 Ant
Auxiliary gateship classes